The , more formally the  was a Byzantine court office attested in the 12th–14th centuries, whose exact functions are unclear.

The title is first attested in the seal of John Komnenos Vatatzes in the 12th century, and over the next two centuries.

References

Sources 
 
 

Byzantine palace offices